Railtown 1897 State Historic Park, and its operating entity, the Sierra Railway, is known as "The Movie Railroad." Both entities are a heritage railway and are a unit of the California State Park System. Railtown 1897 is located in Jamestown, California. The entire park preserves the historic core of the original Sierra Railway of California (later reincorporated as the Sierra Railroad). The railway's Jamestown locomotive and rolling stock maintenance facilities are remarkably intact and continue to function much as they have for over 100 years.  The maintenance facilities are listed on the National Register of Historic Places as the Sierra Railway Shops Historic District.

History 

The Sierra Railway served the West Side Lumber Company mill at Tuolumne, as well as the Pickering (later Standard) Lumber Company 
in Standard, California. The West Side operated an extensive  narrow gauge logging railroad in the Sierra Nevada range. It operated into the 1960s, and was the last of the narrow-gauge logging railways operating in the American West. The Pickering Lumber Company operated an extensive logging railroad that extended northeast of Standard all the way north to what is now the South Grove of Big Trees State Park.

Since 1929, when The Virginian was filmed with the Sierra No 3, the Sierra Railway properties have been a major resource to the motion picture industry. Over 200 movies, TV shows, and commercials have featured Railtown and its trains. Sierra's tracks, locomotives and cars have long been seen on the silver screen; film credits include Go West with the Marx Brothers, High Noon with Gary Cooper and Grace Kelly, 3:10 To Yuma (1957) featured #3 in the end of the movie, as well as Back to the Future Part III with Michael J. Fox and Christopher Lloyd. Television programs that regularly used the Sierra property include Wild, Wild West, Iron Horse, Tales of Wells Fargo, and Petticoat Junction.  The Sierra No. 3 locomotive and Sierra's coach number 5 were the Hooterville Cannonball. Locomotive No. 3 was also used in numerous episodes of Little House on the Prairie.

The Railtown 1897 State Historic Park was one of the 48 California state parks proposed for closure in January 2008 by California's Governor Arnold Schwarzenegger as part of a deficit reduction program, though it did not close.

In May 2011, California State Parks announced the closure of Railtown 1897 along with 69 other parks. The closing was anticipated in July 2012, but due to the efforts of locals and enthusiasts, Railtown 1897 remained open and has received funding to make major repairs to the Sierra No. 28, a steam locomotive original to the Sierra Railway and a mainstay of passenger operations for the park.

The California State Railroad Museum (CSRM), headquartered in Old Sacramento, assumed responsibility for Railtown 1897 State Historic Park on July 1, 1992.

Operations
In addition to seasonal steam and diesel-powered train rides, the Railtown experience includes tours of the locomotive roundhouse originally built in 1910, the machine shop, and related exhibits.  Movie paraphernalia used in filming train sequences is on display.

Volunteer opportunities are available to help preserve and educate the public about the park. Duties include giving tours of the roundhouse as well as delivering speeches about the locomotives and the surrounding areas while on a short train-ride tour.

Locomotive roster

See also

List of heritage railroads in California
List of heritage railways
List of museums in California
Locomotive

References

Bibliography
Warwick Frost (2009). 'Projecting an Image: Film Induced Festivals in the American West'. Event Management 12:2, pp. 95–103.

External links 

Official Railtown 1897 Historic Park website
California State Parks: Railtown 1897 State Historic Park website

1992 establishments in California
California State Historic Parks
Heritage railroads in California
History of the Sierra Nevada (United States)
History of Tuolumne County, California
Museums in Tuolumne County, California
Parks in Tuolumne County, California
Protected areas established in 1992
Protected areas of the Sierra Nevada (United States)
Railroad museums in California
Railroad roundhouses in California
Sonora, California
Transportation buildings and structures in Tuolumne County, California
National Register of Historic Places in Tuolumne County, California
Historic districts on the National Register of Historic Places in California